Chandrasekara Arachchilage Kasun Rajitha (born 1 June 1993) is a professional Sri Lankan cricketer, who plays all formats of the game in international level for Sri Lanka. He is an old boy of St. Servatius' College, Matara.

Early and domestic career
He played in the tour match between Sri Lanka Board President's XI vs Indian national cricket team in August 2015.

In March 2018, he was named in Kandy's squad for the 2017–18 Super Four Provincial Tournament. He was the leading wicket-taker for Kandy during the tournament, with ten dismissals in two matches. The following month, he was also named in Kandy's squad for the 2018 Super Provincial One Day Tournament.

In August 2018, he was named in Galle's squad the 2018 SLC T20 League. He was the leading wicket-taker in the tournament, finishing with thirteen dismissals in six matches. In March 2019, he was named in Kandy's squad for the 2019 Super Provincial One Day Tournament. In October 2020, he was drafted by the Dambulla Viiking for the inaugural edition of the Lanka Premier League.

International career
He made his Twenty20 International (T20I) debut for Sri Lanka against India on 9 February 2016. He took the wickets of two Indian top order batsmen in his very first over. At the end, with the help of other seamers, India were all out for 101 and Sri Lanka won the match comfortably to lead the 3 match series 1–0. For his bowling performance of 3 for 29 runs, Rajitha won man of the match as well. With this victory, Sri Lanka regained the number one spot in the T20I rankings.

In May 2018, he was named in Sri Lanka's Test squad for their series against the West Indies. He made his Test debut for Sri Lanka against the West Indies on 14 June 2018. He took his first Test wicket by dismissing Kraigg Brathwaite.

In July 2018, he was named in Sri Lanka's One Day International (ODI) squad for their series against South Africa. He made his ODI debut for Sri Lanka against South Africa on 1 August 2018. He took his first ODI wicket by dismissing Quinton de Kock.

In March 2019, during the fourth ODI against South Africa, Rajitha and Isuru Udana made the highest partnership for the tenth wicket for Sri Lanka in an ODI match, with 58 runs. However, Rajitha did not score any runs in the partnership, finishing the innings not out without scoring.

In June 2019, he was added to Sri Lanka's squad for the 2019 Cricket World Cup, for the team's last two matches of the tournament. He replaced Nuwan Pradeep, who had contracted chickenpox. On 27 October 2019, in the first T20I match against Australia, Rajitha conceded 75 runs from his four overs, and were the most expensive bowling figures in a T20I match.

In May 2022, in the second match against Bangladesh, Rajitha took his first five-wicket haul in Test cricket, with 5/64.

References

External links
 

1993 births
Living people
Sri Lankan cricketers
Sri Lanka Test cricketers
Sri Lanka One Day International cricketers
Sri Lanka Twenty20 International cricketers
People from Matara, Sri Lanka
Colombo Commandos cricketers
Kilinochchi District cricketers
Cricketers at the 2019 Cricket World Cup